Stara Banja is a village in the municipality of Medveđa, Serbia. According to the 2002 census, the village has a population of 91 people. Of these, 41 (45,05 %) were ethnic Albanians, 36 (39,56 %) were Serbs, 5 (5,49 %) Montenegrins, 1 (1,09 %) Muslim and 8 others.

References

Populated places in Jablanica District
Albanian communities in Serbia